Pucker Up is a 1980 album by American disco act Lipps, Inc.

Pucker Up may also refer to:
 Pucker Up (horse) (born 1953), an American Champion Thoroughbred racing mare
 Pucker Up Stakes, an American Thoroughbred horse race at Arlington Park race track near Chicago, Illinois
 Pucker Up (Sweet 'N Lo album), a 1993 album by rap duo Sweet 'N Lo
 Pucker Up: The Fine Art of Whistling, a documentary film